P65 may refer to:

 Adobe PageMaker, discontinued desktop publishing software
 GRASP65, golgi reassembly stacking protein 1
 Grumman XP-65, an American fighter aircraft design
 , a submarine of the Royal Navy
 P65 road (Ukraine)
 Papyrus 65, a biblical manuscript
 RELA, transcription factor p65
 P65, a state regional road in Latvia